Philippe Tranchant (born 23 April 1956) is a retired French professional footballer who played as a forward. Born in Carrouges, Orne, he is currently the manager of Championnat de France amateur side Caen B.

Tranchant spent the majority of his playing career with Caen, where he made 81 league appearances (29 of them in Division 2) and scored 9 goals. He also had a spell with Lisieux during the 1979–80 season. He was appointed manager of Caen B in 2011.

External links
 

1956 births
Living people
Sportspeople from Orne
French footballers
Association football forwards
Stade Malherbe Caen players
French football managers
Footballers from Normandy